James Simpson (born September 13, 1992) is an American racing driver from Indianapolis.

Racing career
Simpson began racing with a successful career in karting, including two Kart Racers of America Junior Yamaha championships in 2007. While at Purdue University, Simpson won the Purdue Grand Prix and became the only driver to do so for four years in a row. Simpson won between 2013-2016. Simpson continued his success in karting with a win in 2014, and two runner-up finishes (2008 and 2012), in the Robo-Pong 200 endurance race at New Castle Motorsports Park in New Castle, Indiana, one of karting's most high-profile events.  Simpson also competed in the USAC Midget National Championship from 2010 to 2012, competing in 25 races. In 2009 Simpson finished 2nd in the USAC Ford Focus Midget Championship with multiple wins and was named USAC Rookie of the Year in the highly competitive Midwest Division.  He also attended Skip Barber Racing School, tested a Formula BMW car, and has on occasion competed in 410 non-wing sprint car racing at Indiana's well known dirt tracks.

In 2013 Simpson began racing in SCCA Formula Atlantic and captured a race victory in his first National Atlantics race at Sebring International Raceway in January.  Simpson followed the Sebring victory with a win at the first Formula Atlantic event ever held at Circuit of the America's (COTA) in March 2013, and then wins at St. Louis's Gateway International Raceway in June and Watkins Glen in July.  Simpson completed his first Firestone Indy Lights test at the Indianapolis Motor Speedway on May 2 and announced his participation in the Freedom 100 on May 21. He qualified eleventh and finished seventh in the race with Team Moore Racing.

In 2014 Simpson competed full-time in the Atlantic Championship finishing 2nd in the championship with two wins and track records at Watkins Glen and VIR, and also made an appearance in Indy Lights at the Mid-Ohio Sports Car Course double header for Team Moore.

In 2023, after taking time off to focus on his karting business for almost 10 years, Simpson entered the SCCA Super Tour race at Circuit of the Americas.  Simpson raced a Swift 016 prepared by K-Hill Motorsports.  He finished with victories both Saturday and Sunday against a good field of 19 Formula Atlantic cars.

Personal life
Simpson attended Cathedral High School in Indianapolis.  He then attended Purdue University. At Purdue Simpson became the only four time (2013, 2014, 2015, and 2016) winner of the Purdue Grand Prix driving for the Electric Vehicle Club (2013) and Delts Racing (2014–2016).  He also won numerous evGrand Prix races, including the International Intercollegiate Grand Prix at the Indianapolis Motor Speedway in May 2013 and 2014 for electric race cars with the Purdue team. After graduating in 2016 Simpson won the 2017 alumni Grand Prix.

Racing record

Indy Lights

Atlantic Championship Series

References

External links

1992 births
Racing drivers from Indianapolis
Indy Lights drivers
Living people
Atlantic Championship drivers

Team Moore Racing drivers